Ptaki may refer to the following places:
Ptaki, Masovian Voivodeship (east-central Poland)
Ptaki, Kolno County in Podlaskie Voivodeship (north-east Poland)
Ptaki, Łomża County in Podlaskie Voivodeship (north-east Poland)